Alegría is a 2021 Spanish film directed by Violeta Salama. The cast, led by Cecilia Suárez, also features Laia Manzanares, Sarah Perles, Mara Guil and Leonardo Sbaraglia.

Premise 
The film—presented as a "feelgood movie"— is set in Melilla, exploring the blend of cultures in the city, including identity, religious and family issues. After some time installed in the city, Alegría rediscovers her Jewish roots in the wake of the wedding of her niece Yael.

Cast

Production 
Alegría was produced by La Claqueta and Powehi Films alongside La Cruda Realidad, Alegría La Película AIE and 9AM Media Lab, with the participation of RTVE and support from the ICAA, the department of Culture of the Junta de Andalucía, and the department of Culture and Equality of the autonomous city of Melilla. The film had a €2.4 million budget. Filming began in February 2021 and wrapped in March 2021. Besides Melilla, shooting locations included Seville and other places in Andalusia. The film was written by the director Violeta Salama alongside Isa Sánchez. Pau Esteve Birba took over the cinematography.

Release 
The film premiered at the 36th Guadalajara International Film Festival (FCIG) in October 2021, and will also screen at the 18th Seville European Film Festival (SEFF) in November 2021. Distributed by Caramel Films, the film is set for a 10 December 2021 theatrical release in Spain.

Awards and nominations 

|-
| align = "center" rowspan = "3" | 2021 || rowspan = "3" | 34th ASECAN Awards || colspan = "2" | Best Film ||  || rowspan = "3" | 
|-
| Best Screenplay || Violeta Salama, Isa Sánchez || 
|-
| Best Actress || Mara Guil ||  
|-
| align = "center" rowspan = "11" | 2022 || rowspan = "11" | 1st Carmen Awards || Best Fiction Feature Film || La Claqueta PC ||  || rowspan = "11" | 
|-
| Best Screenplay || Isa Sánchez, Violeta Salama || 
|-
| Best Production Supervision || Manolo Limón || 
|-
| Best New Director || Violeta Salama || 
|-
| Best Special Effects || Amparo Martínez || 
|-
| Best Makeup and Hairstyles || Félix Terrero, Yolanda Piña || 
|-
| Best Art Direction || Pepe Domínguez || 
|-
| Best Sound || Jorge Marín, Sara Marín || 
|-
| Best Editing || José M. G. Moyano || 
|-
| Best Supporting Actress || Mara Guil || 
|-
| Best Cinematography || Pau Esteve || 
|}

See also 
 List of Spanish films of 2021

References

External links 
 Alegría at ICAA's Catálogo de Cinespañol
 

2021 films
2020s Spanish-language films
Films about Jews and Judaism
Films set in Melilla
Films shot in Spain
La Claqueta PC films
2020s Spanish films
Films shot in Melilla